During the 1934–35 English football season, Brentford competed in the Football League Second Division. The Bees led the league for much of the second half of the season and were promoted as champions to the First Division for the first time in the club's history. Brentford also won the London Challenge Cup for the first time.

Season summary
Brentford manager Harry Curtis made minor additions to his squad in the 1934 off-season, his only significant purchases being left back George Poyser from Port Vale for a club record £1,150 fee and goalkeeper James Mathieson from Middlesbrough. After two years on the fringes, young right half Duncan McKenzie would break into the first team squad during the season and George Robson would return in attack, having been frozen out during the previous season. Once the season got underway, despite 1933–34's leading scorers Jack Holliday and Idris Hopkins finding the net, it was Ernest Muttitt who inspired the Bees to start the season with a seven-match unbeaten run – a run which took the club to the top of the table, with Muttitt scoring seven goals in a five-match spell.

Aside from two separate spells of three defeats in five matches in September–October 1934 and December–February 1935, Brentford went on two long unbeaten runs during the season and after a 1–0 win over Notts County on 2 March returned the Bees to the top, the team would not be toppled and won the title with two matches to spare after a 3–3 draw with Barnsley on 27 April. A loss and a win in the final two matches saw Brentford confirmed as champions, five points above nearest challengers Bolton Wanderers and West Ham United. The promotion meant that Brentford would play in the First Division for the first time in the club's history and the championship shield was held aloft by captain Herbert Watson after the final match of the season at Griffin Park.

A number of Football League club records were set or equalled during the season, including least home defeats (0, equalling the 1929–30 team's unbeaten record), consecutive home matches undefeated (24, a run which stretched back to April 1934) and Billy Scott became the second Brentford player since the club joined the Football League to score five goals in a match, having netted five times in an 8–1 thrashing of Barnsley on 15 December 1934. He scored a further hat-trick in the return match with Barnsley on 27 April 1935. With his hat-trick versus Port Vale on 20 April 1935, Jack Holliday set a club record of 9 hat-tricks. The club record for highest winning margin in a Football League match was broken twice during the season, first in the 8–1 victory over Barnsley in December 1934 and then in the 8–0 hammering of Port Vale in April 1935. The eight-goal winning margin would stand as the club record until October 1963. A unique double was achieved during the 1934–35 season with Brentford's first-ever victory in the London Challenge Cup. Millwall were beaten 2–1 after extra time in the final at Craven Cottage.

League table

Results
Brentford's goal tally listed first.

Legend

Football League Second Division

FA Cup

 Sources: Statto, 11v11, 100 Years of Brentford

Playing squad 
Players' ages are as of the opening day of the 1934–35 season.

 Sources: 100 Years of Brentford, Timeless Bees, Football League Players' Records 1888 to 1939

Coaching staff

Statistics

Appearances and goals

Players listed in italics left the club mid-season.
Source: 100 Years of Brentford

Goalscorers 

Players listed in italics left the club mid-season.
Source: 100 Years of Brentford

International caps

Full

Amateur

Management

Summary

Transfers & loans 
Cricketers are not included in this list.

References 

Brentford F.C. seasons
Brentford